Romance of the Three Kingdoms is a novel written by Luo Guanzhong.

Romance of the Three Kingdoms may also refer to:
 Romance of the Three Kingdoms (video game series), computer/video game series by Koei
 Romance of the Three Kingdoms (TV series), 1994 CCTV television series
 Three Kingdoms (TV series), 2010 TV series, directed by Gao Xixi
 San Guo Zhi (manhua), by Lee Chi Ching
 Romance of the Three Kingdoms (2009 animation), Chinese-Japanese joint product animation

See also
 Records of the Three Kingdoms (disambiguation)
 Three Kingdoms (disambiguation)